In materials science Functionally Graded Materials (FGMs) may be characterized by the variation in composition and structure gradually over volume, resulting in corresponding changes in the properties of the material. The materials can be designed for specific function and applications. Various approaches based on the bulk (particulate processing), preform processing, layer processing and melt processing are used to fabricate the functionally graded materials.

History
The concept of FGM was first considered in Japan in 1984 during a space plane project, where a combination of materials used would serve the purpose of a thermal barrier capable of withstanding a surface temperature of 2000 K and a temperature gradient of 1000 K across a 10 mm section. In recent years this concept has become more popular in Europe, particularly in Germany. A transregional collaborative research center (SFB Transregio) is funded since 2006 in order to exploit the potential of grading monomaterials, such as steel, aluminium and polypropylen, by using thermomechanically coupled manufacturing processes.

General information
The basic structural units of FGMs are elements or material ingredients represented by maxel. The term maxel was introduced in 2005 by Rajeev Dwivedi and Radovan Kovacevic at Research Center for Advanced Manufacturing (RCAM). The attributes of maxel include the location and volume fraction of individual material components.

A maxel is also used in the context of the additive manufacturing processes (such as stereolithography, selective laser sintering, fused deposition modeling, etc.) to describe a physical voxel (a portmanteau of the words 'volume' and 'element'), which defines the build resolution of either a rapid prototyping or rapid manufacturing process, or the resolution of a design produced by such fabrication means.

Applications
There are many areas of application for FGM. The concept is to make a composite material by varying the microstructure from one material to another material with a specific gradient. This enables the material to have the best of both materials. If it is for thermal, or corrosive resistance or malleability and toughness both strengths of the material may be used to avoid corrosion, fatigue, fracture and stress corrosion cracking.

The transition between the two materials can usually be approximated by means of a power series.
The aircraft and aerospace industry and the computer circuit industry are very interested in the possibility of materials that can withstand very high thermal gradients. This is normally achieved by using a ceramic layer connected with a metallic layer.

The Air Vehicles Directorate has conducted a Quasi-static bending test results of functionally graded titanium/titanium boride test specimens which can be seen below. The test correlated to the finite element analysis (FEA) using a quadrilateral mesh with each element having its own structural and thermal properties.

Advanced Materials and Processes Strategic Research Programme (AMPSRA) have done analysis on producing a thermal barrier coating using Zr02 and NiCoCrAlY. Their results have proved successful but no results of the analytical model are published.

The rendition of the term that relates to the additive fabrication processes has its origins at the RMRG (Rapid Manufacturing Research Group) at Loughborough University in the United Kingdom. The term forms a part of a descriptive taxonomy of terms relating directly to various particulars relating to the additive CAD-CAM manufacturing processes, originally established as a part of the research conducted by architect Thomas Modeen into the application of the aforementioned 
techniques in the context of architecture.

Gradient of elastic modulus essentially changes the fracture toughness of adhesive contacts.

Modeling and simulation

Numerical methods have been developed for modelling the mechanical response of FGMs, with the finite element method being the most popular one. Initially, the variation of material properties was introduced by means of rows (or columns) of homogeneous elements, leading to a discontinuous step-type variation in the mechanical properties. Later, Santare and Lambros  developed functionally graded finite elements, where the mechanical property variation takes place at the element level. Martínez-Pañeda and Gallego extended this approach to commercial finite element software. Contact properties of FGM can be simulated using the Boundary Element Method (which can be applied both to non-adhesive and adhesive contacts). Molecular dynamics simulation has also been implemented to study functionally graded materials. M. Islam  studied the mechanical and vibrational properties of functionally graded Cu-Ni nanowires using molecular dynamics simulation.

Mechanics of functionally graded material structures was considered by many authors.

References

Materials science
Loughborough University
Composite materials